This is a list of Ukraine international footballers, who have played for the Ukraine national football team.

List of players
As of 27 September 2022 (the last game against ) in the senior national representation, 291 football players have made at least one appearance.

{| class="wikitable sortable" style|-
!Name!!Date of birth (age)!!Position!!First Match!!Last Match!!Caps!!Goals!!Date of death
|-
|align="left"|||||MF-DF||2000-04-26||2016-06-21||144||4||
|-bgcolor=lightblue
|align="left"|||||FW-MF||2009-09-05||2022-09-27||112||45||
|-
|align="left"|||||FW||1995-03-25||2012-06-19||111||48||
|-
|align="left"|||||GK||2007-08-22||2022-06-11||102||0||
|-
|align="left"|||||MF||2003-02-12||2018-03-27||100||8||
|-
|align="left"|||||MF-DF||2003-08-20||2016-03-24||98||13||
|-
|align="left"|||||GK||1994-11-13||2012-02-29||92||0||
|-
|align="left"|||||MF-FW||2010-05-25||2020-09-03||86||21||
|-
|align="left"|||||FW||1992-06-27||2006-09-06||75||15||
|-
|align="left"|||||FW||2002-03-27||2012-06-15||74||8||
|-
|align="left"|||||MF||2010-11-17||2022-09-27||73||4||
|-
|align="left"|||||MF-DF||1993-06-26||2006-09-06||71||9||
|-
|align="left"|||||FW||2000-05-31||2008-03-26||68||9||
|-bgcolor=lightblue
|align="left"|||||DF||2000-04-26||2009-02-10||67||0||
|-
|align="left"|||||DF||1996-04-09||2007-11-21||63||1||
|-
|align="left"|||||FW||2008-05-24||2018-09-06||58||11||
|-
|align="left"|||||DF||1995-04-26||2004-02-18||58||0||
|-
|align="left"|||||DF||2006-08-15||2017-06-06||57||2||
|-
|align="left"|||||MF||2003-10-11||2012-11-14||56||12||
|-
|align="left"|||||DF||2003-04-30||2016-06-16||56||0||
|-
|align="left"|||||DF||1993-04-27||2003-09-10||54||5||
|-
|align="left"|||||DF||2009-10-10||2018-10-16||54||5||
|-
|align="left"|||||MF||2014-10-09||2022-09-24||54||3||
|-
|align="left"|||||DF||2017-03-24||2022-09-27||54||0||
|-
|align="left"|||||DF||2010-05-25||2016-11-15||53||2||
|-
|align="left"|||||MF||2015-10-12||2022-06-14||52||8||
|-
|align="left"|||||DF||1992-04-29||2003-09-10||52||0||
|-
|align="left"|||||MF||2015-03-31||2022-09-27||51||7||
|-
|align="left"|||||DF||2009-10-10||2018-03-23||51||3||
|-bgcolor=lightblue
|align="left"|||||FW||2006-06-19||2012-10-12||50||8||
|-
|align="left"|||||DF||2004-03-31||2010-06-02||49||3||
|-
|align="left"|||||MF||2002-05-17||2011-09-06||47||7||
|-
|align="left"|||||DF-MF||2015-10-09||2022-09-21||46||2||
|-bgcolor=lightblue
|align="left"|||||MF-FW||2016-11-12||2022-09-27||43||7||
|-
|align="left"|||||FW||2018-09-06||2022-09-27||42||13||
|-
|align="left"|||||DF||1998-07-15||2008-05-24||39||2||
|-
|align="left"|||||DF||1996-08-13||2004-11-17||39||1||
|-
|align="left"|||||MF||2004-04-28||2007-11-21||36||1||
|-bgcolor=lightblue
|align="left"|||||FW||2008-11-19||2014-05-22||35||7||
|-
|align="left"|||||FW||2010-06-02||2016-11-15||33||4||
|-
|align="left"|||||DF||2011-09-02||2019-03-25||33||0||
|-
|align="left"|||||MF||2016-03-24||2021-11-11||33||0||
|-
|align="left"|||||DF-MF||2006-08-15||2012-11-14||32||0||
|-
|align="left"|||||MF||2011-10-07||2021-11-11||31||2||
|-
|align="left"|||||DF||2011-09-06||2022-09-24||31||0||
|-
|align="left"|||||MF-FW||1996-10-05||2003-09-10||29||3||
|-
|align="left"|||||DF||1999-11-17||2007-11-21||29||1||
|-
|align="left"|||||MF||2003-10-11||2011-11-11||29||1||
|-
|align="left"|||||DF||2007-02-07||2011-10-11||29||0||
|-bgcolor=lightblue
|align="left"|||||MF||2008-09-06||2012-06-15||28||6||
|-
|align="left"|||||DF||2018-11-20||2022-09-27||28||1||
|-
|align="left"|||||MF||2018-05-31||2022-06-14||28||1||
|-
|align="left"|||||MF||1992-10-28||2002-04-17||27||5||
|-bgcolor=lightblue
|align="left"|||||MF||2017-10-06||2021-06-21||27||1||
|-
|align="left"|||||DF||2016-09-05||2021-11-16||27||0||
|-
|align="left"|||||MF||1996-05-01||2000-09-02||25||2||
|-
|align="left"|||||MF||2011-11-11||2021-06-29||24||5||
|-
|align="left"|||||DF||1994-09-07||2003-02-12||24||2||
|-
|align="left"|||||MF||2020-10-07||2022-09-27||24||2||
|-
|align="left"|||||DF||2008-02-06||2013-11-19||24||1||
|-
|align="left"|||||DF||2020-10-07||2022-09-27||24||0||
|-
|align="left"|||||FW||2011-02-08||2019-06-07||23||8||
|-
|align="left"|||||MF||1993-04-27||2000-10-07||23||2||
|-
|align="left"|||||DF||1992-04-29||1997-11-15||23||1||
|-
|align="left"|||||MF||1993-04-27||2003-02-12||22||3||
|-bgcolor=lightblue
|align="left"|||||MF||1995-03-25||1999-03-31||22||1||
|-
|align="left"|||||FW||2004-09-08||2007-03-24||19||5||
|-
|align="left"|||||FW||2016-11-15||2021-06-29||19||2||
|-
|align="left"|||||DF||1996-04-09||2004-03-31||18||0||
|-
|align="left"|||||FW||1994-05-25||2002-05-17||17||3||
|-
|align="left"|||||MF||1994-09-11||1998-10-14||17||0||
|-
|align="left"|||||MF-FW||1994-11-13||1997-05-07||17||0||
|-
|align="left"|||||DF||2002-03-21||2005-10-12||17||0||
|-
|align="left"|||||DF||1997-03-23||2004-09-08||17||0||
|-
|align="left"|||||FW||2001-02-14||2003-09-06||16||3||
|-bgcolor=lightblue
|align="left"|||||MF||2011-08-10||2014-10-12||15||1||
|-
|align="left"|||||DF||2011-10-07||2014-05-22||15||1||
|-
|align="left"|||||GK||2020-10-07||2022-06-05||15||0||
|-bgcolor=lightblue
|align="left"|||||MF||2000-04-26||2004-08-18||15||0||
|-
|align="left"|||||MF||2014-03-05||2021-09-08||15||0||
|-bgcolor=lightblue
|align="left"|||||FW||1993-10-16||1997-03-23||14||8||
|-
|align="left"|||||FW||2021-03-31||2022-09-27||14||6||
|-bgcolor=lightblue
|align="left"|||||FW||1992-08-26||1996-08-31||14||6||
|-
|align="left"|||||MF||2001-08-15||2005-10-12||14||1||
|-
|align="left"|||||MF-DF||2010-11-17||2017-06-06||14||1||
|-
|align="left"|||||DF||1996-04-09||2001-03-28||14||0||
|-
|align="left"|||||MF-FW||1994-09-07||2002-04-17||14||0||
|-
|align="left"|||||MF||1992-10-28||1996-05-01||14||0||
|-
|align="left"|||||DF-MF||1998-07-15||1999-10-09||13||0||
|-
|align="left"|||||DF||2014-05-22||2018-03-27||12||1||
|-bgcolor=lightblue
|align="left"|||||MF||2001-08-15||2006-02-28||12||1||
|-
|align="left"|||||DF||2020-09-03||2022-09-27||12||1||
|-
|align="left"|||||MF-FW||2010-05-25||2015-06-09||12||0||
|-
|align="left"|||||GK||1994-11-13||1997-03-29||12||0||
|-
|align="left"|||||DF||2005-03-30||2007-02-07||12||0||
|-
|align="left"|||||FW||2007-08-22||2015-09-08||11||1||
|-bgcolor=lightblue
|align="left"|||||FW||2019-03-22||2021-03-31||11||1||
|-
|align="left"|||||DF-MF||2009-09-05||2011-06-06||11||0||
|-
|align="left"|||||DF-MF||1992-10-28||1996-05-01||11||0||
|-
|align="left"|||||MF||2008-05-24||2013-06-07||10||1||
|-
|align="left"|||||MF||1998-08-19||2000-04-26||10||1||
|-
|align="left"|||||DF-MF||1992-04-29||1994-09-07||10||1||
|-
|align="left"|||||FW||1998-07-15||2005-10-12||10||1||
|-
|align="left"|||||MF||1992-04-29||1994-11-13||10||0||
|-
|align="left"|||||DF-MF||1993-05-18||1997-06-07||10||0||
|-
|align="left"|||||MF||1992-10-28||1995-11-11||9||1||
|-
|align="left"|||||MF||2017-10-06||2021-09-01||9||0||
|-
|align="left"|||||DF||1992-10-28||1995-04-26||9||0||
|-
|align="left"|||||GK||2018-03-23||2022-09-27||9||0||
|-
|align="left"|||||GK||2001-10-06||2003-04-02||9||0||
|-
|align="left"|||||MF||2015-03-31||2016-05-29||9||0||
|-
|align="left"|||||MF||2002-03-21||2004-10-13||9||0||
|-
|align="left"|||||DF||2018-05-31||2019-09-10||8||0||
|-
|align="left"|||||GK||2010-06-02||2012-02-29||8||0||
|-
|align="left"|||||FW||2008-06-01||2009-09-05||8||0||
|-
|align="left"|||||MF||2002-11-20||2009-02-11||8||0||
|-bgcolor=lightblue
|align="left"|||||GK||2000-05-31||2002-03-27||8||0||
|-
|align="left"|||||MF||2022-06-01||2022-09-27||8||0||
|-
|align="left"|||||DF||2007-02-07||2011-02-09||8||0||
|-
|align="left"|||||MF||2002-03-21||2006-08-15||8||0||
|-
|align="left"|||||DF||1992-08-26||1996-05-01||8||0||
|-
|align="left"|||||DF||2008-05-24||2009-08-12||8||0||
|-bgcolor=lightblue
|align="left"|||||MF||2000-09-02||2001-06-02||8||0||
|-
|align="left"|||||DF||1994-09-07||1998-08-19||8||0||
|-
|align="left"|||||MF||2016-09-05||2019-11-17||7||1||
|-
|align="left"|||||GK||2014-11-18||2021-09-08||7||0||
|-
|align="left"|||||DF||1993-10-16||1995-10-29||7||0||
|-
|align="left"|||||FW||2003-10-11||2005-08-15||7||0||
|-
|align="left"|||||DF||1993-10-16||1996-08-13||7||0||
|-
|align="left"|||||MF||1995-03-25||2003-10-11||7||0||
|-
|align="left"|||||DF||2020-09-03||2022-09-21||7||0||
|-
|align="left"|||||MF||2017-06-06||2020-10-07||7||0||
|-
|align="left"|||||MF||1998-07-15||1999-09-08||7||0||
|-bgcolor=lightblue
|align="left"|||||GK||1994-03-15||1995-03-29||7||0||
|-
|align="left"|||||FW||2021-09-01||2022-06-14||6||1||
|-
|align="left"|||||FW||2014-10-12||2015-03-31||6||0||
|-bgcolor=lightblue
|align="left"|||||MF||1992-08-26||2000-05-31||6||0||
|-
|align="left"|||||DF||1993-10-16||1995-03-29||6||0||
|-
|align="left"|||||MF||2010-05-29||2011-06-06||6||0||
|-
|align="left"|||||DF||1999-10-09||2002-10-12||6||0||
|-
|align="left"|||||GK||1994-08-26||1999-08-18||6||0||
|-
|align="left"|||||DF||2001-08-15||2002-05-19||6||0||
|-
|align="left"|||||MF||2022-06-08||2022-09-27||5||1||
|-
|align="left"|||||MF||2014-05-22||2019-11-14||5||0||
|-
|align="left"|||||DF||2004-02-18||2004-10-13||5||0||
|-
|align="left"|||||FW||1992-04-29||1993-06-26||5||0||
|-bgcolor=lightblue
|align="left"|||||GK||2000-05-31||2008-05-24||5||0||
|-
|align="left"|||||MF||2001-02-14||2002-11-20||5||0||
|-
|align="left"|||||MF-FW||1998-08-19||2002-09-07||5||0||
|-
|align="left"|||||MF||2016-03-24||2018-10-10||5||0||
|-
|align="left"|||||MF||2022-06-08||2022-09-27||5||0||
|-
|align="left"|||||DF||2010-05-25||2010-10-11||5||0||
|-
|align="left"|||||MF-FW||1992-08-26||2001-02-28||5||0||
|-
|align="left"|||||GK||1993-10-16||2003-06-07||5||0||
|-
|align="left"|||||DF-MF||1992-10-28||1993-10-23||5||0||
|-
|align="left"|||||MF||2003-03-29||2003-09-10||4||2||
|-
|align="left"|||||FW||1994-08-26||1994-09-13||4||1||
|-
|align="left"|||||FW||1992-04-29||1997-10-29||4||1||
|-
|align="left"|||||MF-DF||2008-03-26||2008-10-11||4||0||
|-
|align="left"|||||MF||2013-08-14||2014-11-18||4||0||
|-
|align="left"|||||MF||1994-09-11||1999-03-20||4||0||
|-
|align="left"|||||MF||2014-09-03||2014-11-18||4||0||
|-
|align="left"|||||MF||2010-09-04||2011-06-06||4||0||
|-
|align="left"|||||GK||1992-04-29||1993-10-23||4||0||
|-
|align="left"|||||MF||1993-10-16||1994-11-13||4||0||
|-
|align="left"|||||DF||2018-11-16||2019-11-14||4||0||
|-
|align="left"|||||GK||1992-06-27||1993-05-18||4||0||
|-
|align="left"|||||DF||2003-10-11||2006-10-10||4||0||
|-
|align="left"|||||GK||2006-02-28||2007-02-07||4||0||
|-
|align="left"|||||MF||2003-08-20||2006-09-06||4||0||
|-
|align="left"|||||DF-MF||1993-10-16||1994-05-25||4||0||
|-
|align="left"|||||MF||1996-05-01||2002-05-19||4||0||
|-
|align="left"|||||FW||2002-05-17||2002-08-21||3||1||
|-
|align="left"|||||MF||2008-11-19||2009-04-01||3||1||
|-
|align="left"|||||DF||2020-11-11||2022-09-21||3||0||
|-
|align="left"|||||MF||2021-09-08||2021-10-12||3||0||
|-
|align="left"|||||DF||1995-06-11||1995-11-11||3||0||
|-
|align="left"|||||DF||2001-02-26||2001-08-15||3||0||
|-
|align="left"|||||MF-DF||2007-08-22||2007-11-21||3||0||
|-
|align="left"|||||DF||2021-09-08||2022-09-24||3||0||
|-
|align="left"|||||MF||2020-09-06||2020-11-11||3||0||
|-
|align="left"|||||DF||2020-10-07||2020-11-14||3||0||
|-
|align="left"|||||FW||2013-06-02||2013-08-14||3||0||
|-
|align="left"|||||MF-DF||2008-11-19||2010-09-07||3||0||
|-bgcolor=lightblue
|align="left"|||||DF||1992-10-28||1994-11-13||3||0||
|-
|align="left"|||||MF||2016-03-24||2017-06-06||3||0||
|-
|align="left"|||||DF||2004-03-31||2005-03-30||3||0||
|-
|align="left"|||||DF-MF||1992-04-29||1992-08-26||3||0||
|-
|align="left"|||||MF||2002-03-27||2004-02-18||3||0||
|-
|align="left"|||||DF||2010-05-29||2011-03-29||3||0||
|-
|align="left"|||||MF||1994-09-07||1994-11-13||3||0||
|-
|align="left"|||||DF||2021-05-23||2022-06-14||3||0||
|-
|align="left"|||||MF||1993-10-16||1993-10-23||3||0||
|-
|align="left"|||||MF||2001-06-02||2002-09-07||3||0||
|-
|align="left"|||||MF||2021-05-23||2021-06-07||3||0||
|-
|align="left"|||||MF||1994-08-26||1995-03-29||3||0||
|-
|align="left"|||||GK||2021-03-31||2022-09-21||3||0||
|-
|align="left"|||||MF||1992-04-29||1992-08-26||3||0||
|-
|align="left"|||||FW||1992-06-27||1992-08-26||2||1||
|-
|align="left"|||||DF||2021-09-08||2021-10-09||2||1||
|-
|align="left"|||||MF||2003-06-11||2004-02-18||2||1||
|-
|align="left"|||||FW||2011-08-10||2014-05-22||2||0||
|-
|align="left"|||||FW||1997-10-11||1997-10-29||2||0||
|-
|align="left"|||||GK||1996-08-13||1997-03-23||2||0||
|-
|align="left"|||||GK||2008-11-19||2009-06-10||2||0||
|-
|align="left"|||||DF||1992-06-27||1992-08-26||2||0||
|-
|align="left"|||||FW||2018-11-16||2018-11-20||2||0||
|-
|align="left"|||||DF||2010-08-11||2011-08-10||2||0||
|-
|align="left"|||||DF||2008-02-06||2008-03-26||2||0||
|-
|align="left"|||||DF||1992-06-27||1992-08-26||2||0||
|-
|align="left"|||||MF||1992-08-26||1992-10-28||2||0||
|-
|align="left"|||||FW||1993-04-27||1993-05-18||2||0||
|-
|align="left"|||||GK||2010-05-25||2012-06-01||2||0||
|-
|align="left"|||||MF||2013-03-26||2013-08-14||2||0||
|-
|align="left"|||||MF||2014-09-03||2014-09-08||2||0||
|-
|align="left"|||||MF||1993-05-18||1993-06-26||2||0||
|-
|align="left"|||||DF||2008-02-06||2011-02-08||2||0||
|-
|align="left"|||||GK||2012-06-01||2017-11-10||2||0||
|-
|align="left"|||||GK||1993-04-27||1993-06-26||2||0||
|-
|align="left"|||||MF-DF||2010-09-04||2010-10-08||2||0||
|-
|align="left"|||||DF-MF||1999-03-20||1999-08-18||2||0||
|-
|align="left"|||||MF||2003-10-11||2004-02-18||2||0||
|-
|align="left"|||||MF||1996-08-13||1996-08-31||2||0||
|-
|align="left"|||||MF||1992-10-28||1994-10-12||2||0||
|-
|align="left"|||||FW||1995-06-11||1999-08-18||2||0||
|-
|align="left"|||||DF||2009-02-10||2009-02-11||2||0||
|-
|align="left"|||||GK||2021-11-11||2022-06-14||2||0||
|-
|align="left"|||||GK||2011-10-11||2011-11-11||2||0||
|-
|align="left"|||||GK||1994-09-11||1994-09-13||2||0||
|-bgcolor=lightblue
|align="left"|||||MF||1992-04-29||1992-06-27||2||0||
|-
|align="left"|||||DF||2017-11-10||2019-11-14||2||0||
|-
|align="left"|||||DF||2018-11-20||2019-11-14||2||0||
|-
|align="left"|||||FW||2011-09-06||2012-11-14||2||0||
|-
|align="left"|||||MF||2008-11-19||2009-04-01||2||0||
|-
|align="left"|||||MF||2001-02-26||2001-02-28||2||0||
|-
|align="left"|||||GK||2005-08-17||2005-10-12||2||0||
|-
|align="left"|||||DF||2004-02-18||2004-03-31||2||0||
|-
|align="left"|||||DF||2021-09-08||2022-06-08||2||0||
|-
|align="left"|||||DF||1992-04-29||1992-06-27||2||0||
|-
|align="left"|||||GK||2001-09-01||2001-09-05||2||0||
|-
|align="left"|||||MF||1996-10-05||1996-11-09||2||0||
|-
|align="left"|||||MF||2017-11-10||2017-11-10||1||0||
|-
|align="left"|||||DF-MF||1992-08-26||1992-08-26||1||0||
|-
|align="left"|||||FW||1996-04-09||1996-04-09||1||0||
|-
|align="left"|||||FW||2004-02-18||2004-02-18||1||0||
|-bgcolor=lightblue
|align="left"|||||MF||2002-08-21||2002-08-21||1||0||
|-
|align="left"|||||MF||2004-06-06||2004-06-06||1||0||
|-
|align="left"|||||MF||2013-02-06||2013-02-06||1||0||
|-
|align="left"|||||DF||2020-10-07||2020-10-07||1||0||
|-
|align="left"|||||DF||1998-07-15||1998-07-15||1||0||
|-bgcolor=lightblue
|align="left"|||||MF||2007-08-22||2007-08-22||1||0||
|-
|align="left"|||||MF||2013-08-14||2013-08-14||1||0||
|-
|align="left"|||||DF||2011-06-06||2011-06-06||1||0||
|-
|align="left"|||||MF||2019-11-14||2019-11-14||1||0||
|-
|align="left"|||||MF||2002-08-21||2002-08-21||1||0||
|-
|align="left"|||||FW||2004-02-18||2004-02-18||1||0||
|-
|align="left"|||||DF||2016-03-24||2016-03-24||1||0||
|-
|align="left"|||||MF||2001-02-14||2001-02-14||1||0||
|-
|align="left"|||||GK||2009-02-11||2009-02-11||1||0||
|-
|align="left"|||||MF||2021-09-08||2021-09-08||1||0||
|-
|align="left"|||||FW||2017-11-10||2017-11-10||1||0||
|-
|align="left"|||||MF||2000-04-26||2000-04-26||1||0||
|-
|align="left"|||||MF-DF||2015-06-09||2015-06-09||1||0||
|-
|align="left"|||||MF||2005-10-12||2005-10-12||1||0||
|-
|align="left"|||||FW||1995-03-25||1995-03-25||1||0||
|-
|align="left"|||||MF||1992-06-27||1992-06-27||1||0||
|-
|align="left"|||||MF-FW||1992-10-28||1992-10-28||1||0||
|-
|align="left"|||||MF||1993-04-27||1993-04-27||1||0||
|-
|align="left"|||||MF||2017-11-10||2017-11-10||1||0||
|-
|align="left"|||||MF||1995-04-26||1995-04-26||1||0||
|-
|align="left"|||||GK||2001-08-15||2001-08-15||1||0||
|-
|align="left"|||||MF-FW||1992-04-29||1992-04-29||1||0||
|-
|align="left"|||||DF||1992-06-27||1992-06-27||1||0||
|-
|align="left"|||||DF||2002-05-17||2002-05-17||1||0||
|-
|align="left"|||||FW||1994-09-07||1994-09-07||1||0||
|-
|align="left"|||||DF||2016-03-24||2016-03-24||1||0||
|-
|align="left"|||||DF||2014-11-18||2014-11-18||1||0||
|-bgcolor=lightblue
|align="left"|||||FW||1992-04-29||1992-04-29||1||0||
|-
|align="left"|||||MF||1995-11-11||1995-11-11||1||0||
|-
|align="left"|||||DF-MF||1992-04-29||1992-04-29||1||0||
|-
|align="left"|||||MF||2001-02-26||2001-02-26||1||0||
|-bgcolor=lightblue
|align="left"|||||DF||1992-08-26||1992-08-26||1||0||
|-
|align="left"|||||FW||1994-03-15||1994-03-15||1||0||
|-
|align="left"|||||DF||1992-06-27||1992-06-27||1||0||
|-
|align="left"|||||DF||2014-11-18||2014-11-18||1||0||
|-
|align="left"|||||DF||1996-08-13||1996-08-13||1||0||
|-bgcolor=lightblue
|align="left"|||||DF-MF||1992-08-26||1992-08-26||1||0||
|-
|align="left"|||||MF||1994-03-15||1994-03-15||1||0||
|-bgcolor=lightblue
|align="left"|||||MF||1993-05-18||1993-05-18||1||0||
|-
|align="left"|||||MF||2010-06-02||2010-06-02||1||0||
|-
|align="left"|||||DF||2005-10-12||2005-10-12||1||0||
|}

Key
 GK: Goalkeeper
 DF: Defender
 MF: Midfielder
 FW: Forward

See also
 Ukrainians on the Soviet Union national football team
 List of Ukraine national football team captains

Note

References

External links
 Official website of FFU
 Ukraine international footballers
 Football from Dmitri Troshchi 
 National quarter. Byesyedin became 250th player in the history of national team (Национальный четвертак. Беседин стал 250-м игроком в истории сборной). UA-Football. 15 November 2016

 
Association football player non-biographical articles